Goofy's Sky School  is a steel wild mouse roller coaster at the Paradise Gardens Park section of Disney California Adventure in Anaheim, California. The ride is based on Disney's 1940 short film Goofy's Glider.  The rethemed attraction opened on July 1, 2011.

History

Goofy's Sky School originally opened on February 8, 2001, as Mulholland Madness. The attraction's original name came from Mulholland Drive in Los Angeles, California, named after the famed engineer William Mulholland. Within the first month of its operation, three accidents occurred on the ride causing it to be shut for a short period of time for repairs. The ride vehicles were themed to the many cars one can find on the Southern California freeway systems, (such as Highway Patrol cars or Classic Surfer "Woodies"). At the end of the ride, a sign on the wall above read "Rental Car Return".

In November 2004, Alamo Rent a Car became the new sponsor of Mulholland Madness.

On October 12, 2010, Mulholland Madness closed for refurbishment and re-theming as part of Disney California Adventure Park's major refurbishment. On July 1, 2011, the attraction reopened as Goofy's Sky School. The attraction's re-opening was part of a series of moves in an effort to introduce Disney characters into Paradise Pier.

Ride

Goofy's Sky School is a wild mouse roller coaster manufactured by Mack Rides. Riders board a plane and navigate a crash course of flying which features sharp turns, steep drops and sudden stops. Goofy is pictured on billboards throughout the ride teaching guests the step-by-step process of flying a plane:

Lesson 1: How to Take Off
Lesson 2: How to Fly
Lesson 3: How to Turn
Lesson 4: How to Nosedive
Lesson 5: How to Land

References

External links

Goofy (Disney)
Paradise Pier
Paradise Gardens Park
Roller coasters in California
Roller coasters at Disney California Adventure
Roller coasters introduced in 2001
Disney California Adventure
2001 establishments in California